"Don't Worry Baby" is a song by American rock band the Beach Boys from their March 1964 album Shut Down Volume 2. Written by Brian Wilson and Roger Christian,  Wilson's lead vocal on the track is considered one of his defining performances, and he later referred to "Don't Worry Baby" as perhaps the Beach Boys' finest record. It was issued in May 1964 as the B-side of "I Get Around", and charted separately at number 24.

Deriving from Wilson's obsession with the Ronettes' 1963 hit "Be My Baby", "Don't Worry Baby" has a similar musical structure, but different subject matter and production approach. The lyrics portray a braggadocian man who agrees to a drag race, much to his regret, and is subsequently consoled by his girlfriend with the song's title phrase. The song was originally offered to the Ronettes, but was rejected by their producer, Phil Spector, leaving Wilson to produce it for his own band. On the recording, all of the Beach Boys played their own instruments.

"Don't Worry Baby" has appeared in several critics' rankings lists, including Spins "100 Greatest Singles of All Time",  Rolling Stones "500 Greatest Songs of All Time", and Pitchforks "200 Greatest Songs of the 1960s". Cover versions have been recorded by many acts, including the Bay City Rollers, B.J. Thomas, and Ronnie Spector. Thomas' version outperformed the sales of the original record, reaching number 17 in the U.S. and number 1 in Canada. The Beach Boys rerecorded the song with Lorrie Morgan for their 1996 album Stars and Stripes Vol. 1.

Background

"Don't Worry Baby" was composed by Brian Wilson at his home in Hawthorne, California. It was conceived as a response to "Be My Baby", a recent hit by the Ronettes that had amazed and inspired Wilson. In his 1991 memoir, Wouldn't It Be Nice: My Own Story, it is stated that Wilson adopted the song title phrase from his then-girlfriend Marilyn Rovell shortly after hearing "Be My Baby" for the first time. In a 2009 interview, he said that he composed "Don't Worry Baby" over the course of two days. "I started out with the verse idea and then wrote the chorus. It was a very simple and beautiful song. It’s a really heart and soul song, I really did feel that in my heart."

The memoir provides further details of the collaboration: "I called [my] lyricist Roger Christian and told him I had an idea. He met me one afternoon at my parents' house, where, in one of our last collaborations, we wrote a lush ballad whose title and chorus came directly from Marilyn's comforting words, 'Don't Worry, Baby.' I knew the song was a smash before we finished writing it." On another occasion, Wilson recalled, "I met [Roger] in the parking lot at KFWB and he presented the lyrics for me. I went home and wrote the song in about an hour-and-a-half."

Wilson considered having the song recorded by the Ronettes and their producer, Phil Spector, instead of the Beach Boys. In the memoir, it is stated that Wilson changed his mind after discussing the idea with Christian. However, Spector had a general policy against recording songs that he did not write. During a 1994 tribute concert with Wilson in attendance, Ronnie Spector recalled that she and Wilson had discussed "Don't Worry Baby" in 1963 on the only prior occasion they had met. She said, "It was the follow-up to 'Be My Baby,' and [Brian] came running into Gold Star Studios and said, 'I wrote a great song for you!' But of course [Phil] didn't do the writing on it, so [we didn't record it]."

Lyrics
Like previous songs written by Wilson and Christian, "Don't Worry Baby" portrays a hot-rod themed setting, however, unlike "Shut Down" and "Little Deuce Coupe", the song has a more melancholic mood. The lyrics are told from the perspective of a man who regrets involving himself in a drag race. As he confesses his shame to his girlfriend, she consoles him with the song's title phrase. Biographer Timothy Write observed that the song avoids "the darker chill" of "Be My Baby"; rather, "Wilson composed a hapless love token that showed its strength in its sudden, surpassing humility." Catch a Wave author Peter Ames Carlin wrote that Christian drew on Wilson's "stage fright and romantic insecurities" to write the lyrics. Carlin adds,

Biographer Mark Dillon compared the lyrical themes to "a musical equivalent of Rebel Without a Cause." In his book Sonic Alchemy, David Howard wrote that "Don't Worry Baby" was a "subtle harbinger for the growing dichotomy within the California Sound. While 'I Get Around' symbolized the sunshine ideal in all its carefree splendor, 'Don't Worry Baby' suggested something entirely more pensive and even slightly dark underneath its pristine facade."

Composition
Musically, "Don't Worry Baby" is closely similar to "Be My Baby". Both songs start with a standalone drumbeat that is then joined by other instruments. The verses in "Don't Worry Baby" are in E major (the same key as "Be My Baby") and follow a I–IV–V chord progression.  The chorus has the same changes as the verses of "Be My Baby" (I–ii–V), and both choruses have the same scale tones in the melody, albeit with a different rhythm.

One of the ways in which the song distinguishes itself from "Be My Baby" is through the use of a key change preceding the chorus. At the end of the verses, the song shifts from E to F major by repeating a ii7–V sequence one whole step above. Musicologist Philip Lambert notes, "The key shift is a transcendent expression of the change in perspective, from the guy in the verse to the girl in the chorus."

Recording

The Beach Boys recorded "Don't Worry Baby" as part of two eight-hour sessions at United Western Recorders, Hollywood, on January 7, 1964. All of the band members played their own instruments on the recording. Vocals and guitars were overdubbed on January 8 or 9. Take 12 was used for the master. Former member David Marks, who had left the group several months earlier, may have played at this overdubbing session.

Commenting on Wilson's singing, White wrote, "Brian upped the vocal ceiling in his emulative arrangement to accommodate the Wagnerian Minnie Mouse yodel that was Ronette lead singer Ronnie Bennett's standard sonic slope." An alternate take of Wilson's singing was included on the 2013 box set Made in California.

Despite being modeled heavily after "Be My Baby", "Don't Worry Baby" does not emulate Phil Spector's Wall of Sound production technique.

Release

Shut Down Volume 2 was released on March 2, 1964, with "Don't Worry Baby" placed as the second track. On March 14, the band appeared on American Bandstand, during which they lip synced a performance of "Don't Worry Baby". The segment was broadcast on ABC on April 18.

On May 11, "Don't Worry Baby" was issued as the B-side to their single "I Get Around". The B-side charted separately from the A-side due to differences in radio plays, peaking at number 24 on July 4.  Cash Box described it as an "attention-getting shuffle beat cha cha" song that "has the big hit goods."

Legacy and recognition

Biographer David Leaf declared that "Don't Worry Baby" became Wilson's first "pop standard", while Dillon decreed that it marked "one of his defining [vocal] performances on one of his greatest records." In a 1970 interview, Wilson opined, "Probably the best record we've done was 'Don't Worry Baby'. It has about the best proportion of our voices and ranges." Wilson has since called his vocal on the song the best he has done for the band, commenting, "I think I sang it sweetly enough that you could feel the love in my voice."

In 1988, "Don't Worry Baby" was ranked number 11 on Spins list of the greatest singles in history.  In 2010, it was ranked number 178 on Rolling Stones list of the greatest songs in history. In 2010, it was ranked number 14 on Pitchforks list of the greatest songs of the 1960s.

"Don't Worry Baby" was featured in the 2006 film Déjà Vu starring Denzel Washington.

Cover versions and homages 
Terry Melcher drew heavily on "Don't Worry Baby" for his production and arrangement of the Byrds' 1965 rendition of "Mr. Tambourine Man". The two tracks share a similar tempo, as well as the same drum beat and rhythm guitar patterns. Byrds member Roger McGuinn greatly admired "Don't Worry Baby" and stated that, at one point, he listened to the record (alongside "God Only Knows") nearly every morning. "I'd wake up and play those songs. It was really inspirational. It was almost like going to church." Dillon writes that part of the Byrds' subsequent success "can be attributed to how they successfully adapted Beach Boys-style harmonies" on songs such as "Mr. Tambourine Man".

The song was Keith Moon's favorite Beach Boys track, and he recorded two versions of it for his only solo album, Two Sides of the Moon (1975). Another cover by the Bay City Rollers became a Top 40 hit in Australia. B. J. Thomas released "Don't Worry Baby" as a single in 1977, making it the most successful cover, and outperforming the sales of the Beach Boys' version. Thomas later said: "I have always loved the Beach Boys—all of their records. They could do no wrong in my book. Brian Wilson was amazing. It wasn't my biggest hit, but it did sell about 800,000 copies and I still perform it live in concert."

In the 1980s, Randy Bachman and Carl Wilson wrote an homage to "Don't Worry Baby", titled "What's Your Hurry, Darlin'?", that was recorded by Bachman's band Ironhorse. Lorrie Morgan was the featured guest on the Beach Boys' rerecording of "Don't Worry Baby" for the band's 1996 album Stars and Stripes Vol. 1. Garbage's 1998 single, "Push It", contained an interpolation of the "Don't Worry Baby" chorus; Wilson and Christian were subsequently given songwriting credits on "Push It".

Personnel
Per Craig Slowinski.

The Beach Boys
Al Jardine – backing vocals, electric bass guitar
Mike Love – backing vocals
Brian Wilson – lead and backing vocals, piano
Carl Wilson – backing vocals, electric rhythm guitar
Dennis Wilson – backing vocals, drums

Additional musicians and production staff
Chuck Britz – engineer

David Marks may have played the overdubbed lead guitar solo, however, Slowinski could not confirm this with complete certainty.

Charts

Weekly singles charts

Year-end charts

See also
 "Mona" – a 1977 Beach Boys song, written by Wilson, that discuss some of his favorite songs by Spector, including "Da Doo Ron Ron" and "Be My Baby".

References

Bibliography

External links
 
 
 
 
 

1964 songs
1964 singles
1976 singles
1977 singles
The Beach Boys songs
B. J. Thomas songs
Bay City Rollers songs
Lorrie Morgan songs
Songs written by Brian Wilson
Rock ballads
Pop ballads
1960s ballads
Songs written by Roger Christian (songwriter)
Song recordings produced by Brian Wilson
Song recordings produced by Jimmy Ienner
Capitol Records singles
MCA Records singles
Bell Records singles
Songs about cars
Answer songs
California Sound
Teen pop